Daniil Dushevskiy (born 1 March 2004) is a Belarusian footballer who plays for Minsk.

References

External links

2004 births
Living people
Belarusian footballers
Association football midfielders
FC Minsk players